Basil Bradfield (17 July 1922 – 18 May 2009) was a South African cricketer. He played in twenty-one first-class matches for Eastern Province from 1952/53 to 1956/57.

See also
 List of Eastern Province representative cricketers

References

External links
 

1922 births
2009 deaths
South African cricketers
Eastern Province cricketers
People from Makhanda, Eastern Cape
Cricketers from the Eastern Cape